Ika (Ika-Annang) is a Local Government Area in Akwa Ibom State, Nigeria. The headquarters of the Ika local government area is Urua Inyang. Ika is subdivided into clans Urban (1 & II), Ito (1, II and III) Achan (1, II and III) and Odoro (1 & II) and over 50 villages in totality with an identical cultural display called Akakum nicknamed Afum (meaning wind). Displayed mostly at Christmas.

Ika is one of the eight Annang local government areas of the present thirty-one local government areas in Akwa Ibom State.  Ika local government area of Annang people Annang or Ika people (Ika-Annang) were formerly in the old Abak which was subdivided into other local governments resulting in five new local government areas, namely Abak, Oruk-Anam, Etim-Ekpo, Ukanafun and Ika local government areas.

A few villages in Ika Local Government Area have historical and cultural affiliations to the Igbo people. Villages like Ikot Inyang (Formerly known as Oboeze- meaning Umubueze ( People of Kings) in Igbo language) has strong affiliations with the Igbo people.

The language of the Ika people of Akwa Ibom State is an Annang dialect of the Annang people.

References 

Local Government Areas in Akwa Ibom State